Andrew Bell (born 12 February 1984) is an English footballer who plays for Nelson as a striker.

Career
Born in Blackburn, Lancashire, Bell started his career with hometown club Blackburn Rovers at the age of 10 and signed a professional contract in February 2001 after nearly a decade in the youth system. He had a trial at Wycombe Wanderers in April 2003 and after being released by Blackburn in the summer he signed for Wycombe on a month-to-month contract in September, making his debut and scoring both goals in a 5–2 defeat to Oldham Athletic. His contract was extended until 29 February in January, before being released and joining York City on trial. He signed for York on non-contract terms on 1 March and made his debut in a 0–0 draw at Oxford United. His only goal for York came in a 3–1 defeat to Scunthorpe United, after he scored into an empty goal from a Stuart Wise long ball. He finished the 2003–04 season with 10 appearances and one goal for York as they were relegated to the Conference National.

He signed for Southern Football League Premier Division team Hednesford Town in August 2004 and scored on his debut. He was top goalscorer for the 2004–05 season with 20 goals in 36 appearances as the team won promotion to the Conference North and rejected a new contract in July to trial with League Two team Darlington. He re-signed for Hednesford after failing to secure a contract with Darlington.

Fleetwood Town of the Northern Premier League signed him in February 2006. Bell became Fleetwood's Top Scorer when they were crowned Northern Premier League Champions in the 2007–08 Season. He was transfer-listed following discussions with manager Micky Mellon in July 2009. Bell joined Kendal Town on a month's loan in November, which was extended to March 2010. Bell then moved to Guiseley AFC where he remained from March 2010 until July 2010.

He signed for AFC Fylde in Northern Premier League Division One North in July 2010. He played one season for the Coasters and signed for Kendal Town in July 2011. In January 2012 he joined Radcliffe Borough for just 3 months.

Bell currently plays for Bamber Bridge where he has been since March 2012. In the summer of 2015 he left Bamber Bridge to sign for North West Counties Football League Premier Division side Nelson.

Personal life
His father is former player Norman Bell.

Andrew and his father Norman set up a Charity called Opportunity Sports Foundation http://www.opportunitysports.org
The charity is aimed at helping disadvantaged young people in Lancashire. It follows the pairs involvement in youth work in the local area following their careers as footballers.

Career statistics
As of 12 December 2009.

Footnotes

A.  The "League" column constitutes appearances and goals (including those as a substitute) in the Football League, Football Conference, Northern Premier League and Southern Football League.
B.  The "Other" column constitutes appearances and goals (including those as a substitute) in the Football League Trophy and play-offs.

References
http://www.opportunitysports.org

External links

England profile at the FA

1984 births
Living people
Footballers from Blackburn
English footballers
Association football forwards
Blackburn Rovers F.C. players
Wycombe Wanderers F.C. players
York City F.C. players
Hednesford Town F.C. players
Fleetwood Town F.C. players
Kendal Town F.C. players
Guiseley A.F.C. players
AFC Fylde players
Radcliffe F.C. players
Bamber Bridge F.C. players
Nelson F.C. players
A.F.C. Darwen players
English Football League players
National League (English football) players
Northern Premier League players